Thompson Joseph "Tom" O'Brien (11 October 1889 – 11 September 1963) was an Australian rules footballer who played with University in the Victorian Football League (VFL).

Sources
Holmesby, Russell & Main, Jim (2007). The Encyclopedia of AFL Footballers. 7th ed. Melbourne: Bas Publishing.

1889 births
1963 deaths
Australian rules footballers from New South Wales
University Football Club players
People educated at Xavier College
People from Adelong, New South Wales